Richard Dempsey ( in Welwyn Garden City, Hertfordshire, England) is an English actor.

Biography 
Richard Dempsey is an English stage, film, and television actor. His first role came at the age of 15, when he appeared as Peter Pevensie in the BBC's adaptation of The Lion, the Witch and the Wardrobe in 1988. The following year, he appeared in the adaptation of Prince Caspian.

His film appearances include  My Policeman, 1917, Genius and Royal Deceit.

His subsequent TV appearances have included Doc Martin, Dracula, Sherlock Holmes (The Last Vampyre), Crime Traveller, Island at War and Egypt.

He made his professional stage debut in the role of Jack in the Original London production of the award-winning musical Into the Woods with music and lyrics by Stephen Sondheim at The Phoenix Theatre.  After training at the Guildhall School of Music and Drama he starred as Nick Piazza in the Original Cast of West End hit musical Fame and played Ugly in the original UK production of Honk!. In 2005 he appeared in the critically acclaimed Chichester Production of Just So, playing the lead role of the Elephant's Child.

He has since performed in a large variety of roles in television, film and on stage with the Royal Shakespeare Company, the Royal National Theatre, Michael Grandage Company, Frantic Assembly and Propeller.

He appeared in the 2019 Royal Shakespeare Company production of Don Quixote stepping into the title role when David Threlfall was indisposed.

In the Michael Grandage West End production of A Midsummer Night's Dream he played Peter Quince opposite David Walliams as Bottom. This was followed by a year playing Mr Bucket in Sam Mendes West End production of "Charlie and the Chocolate Factory" at The Theatre Royal Dury Lane, also appearing as Willy Wonka.

He played The Compère in the North American Premiere of the WYP production of Baz Luhrmann's Strictly Ballroom at The Prince of Wales Theatre, Toronto.

In Rob Ashford's Chichester Festival Theatre production of "A Damsel in Distress" he played Reggie Byng. "Richard Dempsey adorable as Reggie" Financial Times, "Richard Dempsey"s silly ass is the essence of adorability" The Sunday Times.

In the 2015 London revival of TS Eliot's The Cocktail Party he played Edward Chamberlain directed by Abby Wright, "beautifully pitched" Financial Times

He also starred in Mark Ravenhill's Citizenship with Matt Smith, Andrew Garfield and Andrea Riseborough at the Royal National Theatre, and toured with the production to Hong Kong.

Dempsey appeared in the original cast of the stage adaptation of Eleanor Bergstein's Dirty Dancing at the Aldwych Theatre in London's West End playing Neil Kellerman.

Dempsey appeared in Edward Hall's all-male productions of A Midsummer Night's Dream and The Merchant of Venice, playing Titania and Lorenzo, touring to New York's Brooklyn Academy of Music, Tokyo, Rome, Athens, Milan, Galway and throughout the UK. "The moonlit romantic scene in the last act between Jessica and her husband, Lorenzo, played with a light ease by Richard Dempsey, is an unexpected high point."-The New York Times .He played opposite Josefina Gabrielle as The Rt Hon Gerald Bolingbroke in the Sheffield Crucible's production of Me and My Girl.

Returning to Propeller he played Hermione in The Winter's Tale alongside Henry V at the Hampstead Theatre in London and toured the productions to Australia, New Zealand and China.  "Richard Dempsey's Hermione, whose appeal against the accusation of adultery is handled with an exquisite balance of bewilderment, dignity and despair."- The Guardian

He played Toddy in the Southwark Playhouse production of Victor Victoria  "Richard Dempsey as Toddy is so endearing you want to hug him" - The Telegraph

Richard Dempsey's voice can be heard on the Original UK Cast Recordings of Into the Woods, Fame, Honk!, Just So, Dirty Dancing, and the concert recording of A Spoonful of Stiles and Drewe.

In 2022, Dempsey appeared as Nicholas II of Russia in Doctor Who and as Paul Crouch in the world premiere, at London’s Almeida Theatre, of the musical Tammy Faye, written by Elton John, Jake Shears, and James Graham.

Filmography

Film

Television

Theatre Credits

References

External links 
 Richard Dempsey's Official Website
 
 Dirty Dancing - Richard Dempsey's Video Diary

English male film actors
English male child actors
Living people
1973 births
People from Hatfield, Hertfordshire
English male television actors
English male musical theatre actors
English male stage actors
Musicians from Hertfordshire
Male actors from Hertfordshire